Walid Sabbar (born 25 February 1996) is a Moroccan football midfielder who currently plays for Botola club Raja CA. He was a squad member for the 2013 FIFA U-17 World Cup.

Honours
Raja CA
Coupe du Trône: 2017

Morocco
Toulon Tournament: runner-up 2015

References 

1996 births
Living people
Moroccan footballers
Raja CA players
Kawkab Marrakech players
Olympic Club de Safi players
Emirates Club players
Botola players
UAE Pro League players
Association football midfielders
Morocco youth international footballers
Moroccan expatriate sportspeople in the United Arab Emirates
Expatriate footballers in the United Arab Emirates
2020 African Nations Championship players
Morocco A' international footballers